Gaur Daha is a census town within the jurisdiction of the Canning police station in the Canning I CD block in the Canning subdivision of the South 24 Parganas district in the Indian state of West Bengal.

Geography

Area overview
Canning subdivision has a very low level of urbanization. Only 12.37% of the population lives in the urban areas and 87.63% lives in the rural areas. There are 8 census towns in Canning I CD block and only 2 in the rest of the subdivision. The entire district is situated in the Ganges Delta with numerous islands in the southern part of the region. The area (shown in the map alongside) borders on the Sundarbans National Park and a major portion of it is a part of the Sundarbans settlements. It is a flat low-lying area in the South Bidyadhari plains. The Matla River is prominent and there are many streams and water channels locally known as khals. A comparatively recent country-wide development is the guarding of the coastal areas with a special coastal force.

Note: The map alongside presents some of the notable locations in the subdivision. All places marked in the map are linked in the larger full screen map.

Location

Kalaria, Gaur Daha and Banshra form a cluster of census towns in the Canning I CD block, as per the map of the Canning I CD block on page 333 of the District Census Handbook.

Another cluster of census towns formed by Garia, Champahati, Solgohalia and Naridana, in the Baruipur CD block, is adjacent to the above cluster, as per the map of the Baruipur CD block in the District Census Handbook for South 24 Parganas.

Demographics
According to the 2011 Census of India, Gaur Daha had a total population of 5,260, of which 2,708 (51%) were males and 2,552 (49%) were females. There were 611 persons in the age range of 0 to 6 years. The total number of literate persons in Gaur Daha was 3,373 (72.55% of the population over 6 years).

Infrastructure
According to the District Census Handbook 2011, Gaur Daha covered an area of 3.0674 km2. Among the civic amenities, it had 5 km roads, the protected water supply involved overhead tank and service reservoir. It had 179 domestic electric connections. Among the medical facilities it had 6 dispensaries/ health centres. Among the educational facilities it had were 2 primary schools and 2 senior secondary schools.

Transport
Gaur Daha is on the Piyali-Ghutiari Sharif Road.

Gourdaha Halt railway station is on the Sealdah–Canning line of the Kolkata Suburban Railway system.

Commuters
With the electrification of the railways, suburban traffic has grown tremendously since the 1960s. As of 2005-06, more than 1.7 million (17 lakhs) commuters use the Kolkata Suburban Railway system daily. After the partition of India, refugees from East Pakistan/ Bangladesh had a strong impact on the development of urban areas in the periphery of Kolkata. The new immigrants depended on Kolkata for their livelihood, thus increasing the number of commuters. Eastern Railway runs 1,272 EMU trains daily.

Healthcare
Ghutiari Sharif Block Primary Health Centre at Ghutiari Sharif, with 10 beds, is the major government medical facility in the Canning I CD block.

References

Cities and towns in South 24 Parganas district